The Roma Port of Entry was established in 1928 with the construction of the first suspension bridge.  The current bridge was built in 1988, but the historic Roma – Ciudad Miguel Alemán International Bridge remains adjacent to it and is not currently used.
The Mexican City of San Pedro de Roma was renamed Ciudad Miguel Alemán, Tamaulipas after former Mexican President Miguel Alemán Valdés.  The city of Roma, Texas was once the westernmost navigable seaport on the Rio Grande, but by 1900, water drawn from the river for irrigation upstream had so severely lowered the water levels that vessel traffic had virtually ceased.

See also
 List of Mexico–United States border crossings
 List of Canada–United States border crossings

References

Mexico–United States border crossings
1928 establishments in Texas
Buildings and structures in Starr County, Texas